The Appeal-Democrat is a daily broadsheet newspaper printed in Marysville, California, United States. It has an estimated circulation of 13,000 copies a day, primarily in Yuba and Sutter counties. The paper also is sold in Colusa County to the west and Butte County to the north.

History 
The Appeal-Democrat formed from the 1926 merger of two earlier newspapers, the Marysville Appeal (founded in 1860) and the Marysville Evening Democrat (founded in 1884).

R.C. Hoiles, who built the Freedom Communications newspaper chain around the Santa Ana paper that became the Orange County Register, bought the Appeal-Democrat in 1946 and placed his son-in-law Robert C. Hardie in charge as its publisher.

Hardie directed the paper for the next 55 years, as circulation rose from about 7,500 to more than 20,000. Even as residents and businesses gradually shifted west from Marysville to nearby Yuba City, Hardie kept the Appeal-Democrat in its longtime home, twice acquiring new headquarters there (in 1950 and 1986).

In 2013, Freedom sold the Appeal-Democrat to Vista California, a subsidiary of Horizon Publications.

Subsidiaries 
The Appeal-Democrat also publishes the Colusa County Sun-Herald, the Corning Observer, and the Glenn County Transcript.

References

External links 

Appeal-Democrat official site
Official mobile website
Freedom Communications subsidiary profile of the Appeal-Democrat

Daily newspapers published in California
Marysville, California
Sutter County, California
Yuba County, California
Companies based in Yuba County, California
Newspapers established in 1860
1860 establishments in California
Freedom Communications